= Greg Perlman =

Philanthropist and real estate investor

Greg Perlman is an American real estate investor and philanthropist. He founded GHC Housing Partners, a United States real estate company, and with his wife, Jodi Perlman, he established The Change Reaction, a Los Angeles nonprofit that provides financial assistance to individuals and families in economic hardship.

== Philanthropy ==
Perlman set up a foundation in 2009 that at first helped residents of properties his company managed. It was later renamed All Ways Up and supports educational opportunities for students from low-income backgrounds, including first-generation college students.

Perlman and his wife have also supported the San Fernando Valley Rescue Mission, where their giving included financial help for families moving from shelters into permanent housing.

=== The Change Reaction ===
The couple founded The Change Reaction in Los Angeles in 2019. It makes one-time grants to households facing unexpected expenses, with recipients generally identified through referrals from social workers, healthcare professionals, teachers, and community organizations.

Its grants have gone toward rent, transportation, housing deposits, and other household necessities. By October 2025 the organization had distributed more than $60 million to over 43,000 families, and its referral network included about 180 charities, 70 schools, and 15 hospitals.

=== Wildfire relief ===
Following the January 2025 Southern California wildfires, Perlman and his wife provided $10 million through The Change Reaction to establish a relief fund for affected residents. The organization had assisted approximately 3,000 people by February 2025, including households displaced by the fires.

The Associated Press reported that the fund's referral-based distribution let payments go out without a conventional public application process, though people without ties to participating community organizations could be missed. The fund later received additional contributions from outside donors.

== Recognition ==
In May 2026, Perlman and his wife, Jodi, were included in Time magazine's TIME100 Philanthropy list.
